William Wollaston (1659–1724) was an English philosophical writer.

William Wollaston is also the name of:

 William Hyde Wollaston (1766–1828), English chemist
 William Wollaston (Ipswich MP elected 1733) (1693–1764), M.P. for Ipswich between 1733 and 1734
 William Wollaston (Ipswich MP elected 1768) (1730–1797), M.P. for Ipswich between 1768 and 1784